Lyman Sherwood (August 5, 1802 Hoosick, Rensselaer County, New York – September 2, 1865 Lyons, Wayne County, New York) was an American lawyer and politician from New York.

Life
He was the son of Lemuel Sherwood (1775–1839) and Mercy (Rose) Sherwood (1781–1833). On July 4, 1827, he married Rhoda Harmon Hinsdale (1806–1861), and they had two children.

He was Surrogate of Wayne County from 1833 to 1844. He was a member of the New York State Senate (7th D.) in 1842 and 1843.

He was District Attorney of Wayne County from 1846 to 1847. He was First Judge and Surrogate of the Wayne County Court from 1860 to 1863.

Sources
The New York Civil List compiled by Franklin Benjamin Hough (pages 133f, 145, 384 and 419; Weed, Parsons and Co., 1858)
The New York Civil List compiled by Franklin Benjamin Hough, Stephen C. Hutchins and Edgar Albert Werner (1867; pg. 436)
Obituary transcribed from The Commercial Press (issue of October 1865), at NY Gen Web
Lyman Sherwwood at Ancestry.com

1802 births
1865 deaths
Democratic Party New York (state) state senators
People from Hoosick, New York
People from Lyons, New York
Wayne County District Attorneys
19th-century American politicians